Polysentor gorbairdi is an extinct holocephalid that lived during the Pennsylvanian. It is a member of the Mazon Creek fauna of Illinois.

References 

Carboniferous cartilaginous fish
Pennsylvanian fish of North America
Holocephali